Sandip Roy (born 1 November 1989) is a Bangladeshi cricketer. He made his List A debut for Abahani Limited in the 2017–18 Dhaka Premier Division Cricket League on 10 March 2018.

References

External links
 

1989 births
Living people
Bangladeshi cricketers
Abahani Limited cricketers
Place of birth missing (living people)